Lionel-Cinq-Mars Ecological Reserve is an ecological reserve in Quebec, Canada. It was established on February 17, 1988.

References

External links
 Official website from Government of Québec

Protected areas of Chaudière-Appalaches
Nature reserves in Quebec
Protected areas established in 1988
1988 establishments in Quebec